Henry Norris may refer to:
Sir Henry Norris (courtier) (c. 1482–1536), Groom of the Stool to Henry VIII, alleged lover of Anne Boleyn
Sir Henry Norris, 1st Baron Norreys (1525–1601), Elizabethan courtier
Henry Norreys (colonel-general) (1554–1599), English soldier and son of Henry Norris, 1st Baron Norreys
Henry Handley Norris (1771–1850), English High Church clergyman
Sir Henry Norris (businessman) (1865–1934), British businessman, football chairman and politician
Henry Norris (engineer) (1816–1878), British civil engineer

See also
Henry Norris Russell (1877–1957), US astronomer
Norris (disambiguation)
Norreys